María Esther Vázquez (4 August 1937 – 25 March 2017) was an Argentine writer and journalist, best known as a collaborator and biographer of Jorge Luis Borges and Victoria Ocampo.

Biography
She was born in Buenos Aires in 1937 into a family of Galician descent. Her father was born in Cambados, and her mother in Vilanova de Arousa. At 16, she entered the Universidad de Buenos Aires to study literature. In 1957, while working at the National Library, she met the library's director, Jorge Luis Borges. He introduced her to his fellow writers from Sur magazine.

At the beginning of the '60s, she dated Borges, and in February 1964 they announced their marriage, although several months later they split up. They remained friends and wrote a couple of books together. Vázquez wrote a biography on Borges, ten years after his death, called Borges: Esplendor y derrota (Borges: Splendor and Defeat).

Personal life
She married poet and writer Horacio Armani in on 14 December 1965. They were married for nearly 50 years before his death in 2013.

She died in Buenos Aires in March 2017 of a cerebral hemorrhage.

Honors
Her honors included:
1988: Order of Merit of the Italian Republic
1987: Konex Award
1995: Comillas Prize of the Tusquets Publishing House in Spain
1997: Prize of the International Book Fair of Buenos Aires
2004: Konex Award
2012: Rosalía de Castro Award from the PEN Club of Galicia
2012: the Gold Medal of Emigration from the Federation of Spanish Societies of Argentina

Bibliography
Los nombres de la muerte (1964)
Introducción a la literatura inglesa (1965); co-written with Jorge Luis Borges.
Literaturas germánicas medievales (1966); co-written with Jorge Luis Borges.
El mundo de Manuel Mujica Láinez (1983)
Desde la niebla (1988)
Victoria Ocampo (1993)
Borges: esplendor y derrota (1996)
Borges, sus días y su tiempo (1999)
Victoria Ocampo. El mundo como destino (2002)
La memoria de los días (2004)

Notes

References

1937 births
2017 deaths
Argentine essayists
Argentine women short story writers
Argentine women journalists
Jorge Luis Borges
Writers from Buenos Aires
Argentine people of Galician descent